The Mohamed V Dam is an arch-gravity dam located  south of Zaio on the Moulouya River in Oujda-Angad Province, Morocco. Water is also used for hydroelectric power production and water supply to the city of Nador. The dam is named after Mohammed V of Morocco. The dam's reservoir and wetlands were designated as a Ramsar site in 2005.

See also

Al Massira Dam – another Ramsar site in Morocco
 List of power stations in Morocco

References

Dams completed in 1967
Energy infrastructure completed in 1967
Dams in Morocco
Arch-gravity dams
Hydroelectric power stations in Morocco
Ramsar sites in Morocco
Buildings and structures in Oriental (Morocco)
20th-century architecture in Morocco